The following were mayors of Poole, Dorset, England:

1515–16, 1521–2, 1530–1, 1536–7, 1543–4: William Biddlecombe
1697–8, 1703–4, 1704–5: William Phippard
1798: John Jeffery
2015: Janet Walton
2018: Sean Gabriel
2019, 2020: Marion Le Poidevin
2021: Julie Bagwell
2022: Tony Trent

References

 
Poole